Paul W. Westermeyer is a public historian and the 2015 recipient of "The Brigadier General Edwin Simmons-Henry I. Shaw Award" for his book Liberating Kuwait: U.S. Marines in the Gulf War, 1990–1991.

Education 
Westermeyer received both his bachelor's (in history) and master's degrees (in military history) from Ohio State University.

Career 
He began his career teaching history at Ohio State University and Columbus State Community College.
In 2005, Westermeyer became a historian for the Marine Corps History Division, where he began publishing books.

Awards 
In 2015, Westermeyer was awarded The Brigadier General Edwin Simmons–Henry I. Shaw Award for superior historical scholarship, a prize presented by the Marine Corps Heritage Foundation.

Bibliography

Books 
 HackJammer: HackMaster Adventures in Space

 U.S. Marines in Battle: Al-Khafji, January 28 - February 1, 1991

 Liberating Kuwait: U.S. Marines in the Gulf War, 1990-1991

 Desert Voices: An Oral History Anthology of Marines in the Gulf War, 1990-1991

 U.S. Marines in Afghanistan, 2010-2014: Anthology and Annotated Bibliography

 The Legacy of Belleau Wood: 100 years of making Marines and winning battles, an anthology

 The Legacy of American Naval Power: Reinvigorating Maritime Strategic Thought

 The United States Marine Corps: The Expeditionary Force at War

Magazine Articles 
 Shattered Amphibious Dreams: The Decision Not to Make an Amphibious Landing during Operation Desert Storm

 Every Marine a Flag Raiser: The Legacy and Meaning of the Iwo Jima Flag Raisings

 Historiography for Marines: How Marines should read and understand histories

Presentations 
 Mountain Storm: Counter-insurgency and the Marine Air-Ground Task Force

See also 
 United States Marine Corps History Division

References

External links 
 Westermeyer's  faculty page at the Marine Corps University's site
 Westermeyer's  author page at Amazon.com

Living people
American military historians
Year of birth missing (living people)